Sae Kitakata (born 27 August 1998) is a Japanese professional footballer who plays as a defender for WE League club Nojima Stella.

Club career 
Kitakata made her WE League debut on 12 September 2021.

References 

WE League players
People from Tondabayashi, Osaka
Living people
1998 births
Japanese women's footballers
Women's association football defenders
Association football people from Osaka Prefecture
Nojima Stella Kanagawa Sagamihara players